Vocational Education Foundation & IEC Group of Institutions is establishing IEC Institute of Health Sciences and Research at Hamirpur, Himachal Pradesh to establish one-stop comprehensive healthcare facility with other associated amenities in an eco-friendly environment at an affordable cost to all sections of the population including the BPL populations of the entire area.

The Trust/Society envisages a new medical college in the name of "IEC Institute of Medical Sciences and Research" and, with its affiliated IEC Hospital, to meet the growing demand for trained medical professionals and to tap the unexplored potential in the Indian youth.

Courses

Undergraduate 
 MBBS – Bachelor of Medicine and Bachelor of Surgery (5-½ years)
 Nursing
 Pharmacy (D. Pharm & B. Pharm (2–4 years)
 AHS – Paramedical Courses (X-Ray Technology and Radiology, Medical Laboratory Technology, Physiotherapy, Occupational Therapy, Optometry of Ophthalmic Technology, Operation Theater Technology, Medical Biotechnology)
 Bachelor of Ayurveda Medicine & Surgery (BAMS) (4 + 1 years)
 Bachelor of Naturopathy & Yogic Sciences (B.N.Y.S.) (3 + 1 years)

Postgraduate
 MD (Dermatology, Venerology & Leprosy, Physical Medicine & Rehabilitation, Health Administration, etc.)
 MS (Anatomy, ENT,  General Surgery, Obstetrics & Gynaecology, etc.)

Diplomas
Diploma in Bacteriology, Obstetrics & Gynaecology,  Child Health,  Occupational Health Community Medicine, Ophthalmology,  Clinical Pathology, etc.

Infrastructure 
The facilities in the college include lecture theatres, laboratories, examination halls, auditorium, medical laboratories, library, central photographic section, central workshop etc.

In addition to the above facilities, the medical college and hospital will have other ancillary facilities and utilities like Central Incineration Plant, Research Work Facilities, Central Gas Supply Unit, Intercom Network, Statistical Unit, Playground & Gymnasium, Medical Education Unit, Sanitation & Water Supply.

External links 
 IEC Institute of Medical Sciences & Research
 IEC Group of Institutions
 IEC Business School
 IEC Blogs

Universities and colleges in Himachal Pradesh
Education in Hamirpur district, Himachal Pradesh